Victor Herbert Cockcroft (born 25 February 1941) is an English retired professional footballer who played in the Football League for Northampton Town and Rochdale as a full back. He was capped by England at youth level and was a part of the Northampton Town squad during the club's only season in the top-flight of English football.

Career statistics

References 

1941 births
Living people
Footballers from Birmingham, West Midlands
Association football fullbacks
English footballers
Rochdale A.F.C. players
Wolverhampton Wanderers F.C. players
Northampton Town F.C. players
English Football League players
Kidderminster Harriers F.C. players
England youth international footballers